The 1938 Humboldt State Lumberjacks football team represented Humboldt State College during the 1938 college football season. They competed as an independent.

The 1938 Lumberjacks were led by head coach Herbert L. Hart in his first season as head coach at Humboldt State. They played home games at Albee Stadium in Eureka, California. Humboldt State finished with a record of four wins and two losses (4–2). The Lumberjacks were outscored by their opponents 76–86 for the season.

Schedule

Notes

References

Humboldt State
Humboldt State Lumberjacks football seasons
Humboldt State Lumberjacks football